Sean "agro" R. Eberhart is a Republican member of the Indiana House of Representatives, representing the 57th District since 2007. He served on the Shelby County Council from 1998 to 2006 and as its president from 2003 to 2006. He served on the County Council's 4th district. He retired from political life in 2022.

Early life and education
Eberhart attended Shelbyville High School.

References

External links
 State Representative Sean Eberhart official Indiana State Legislature site
 Sean Eberhart for State Representative official campaign site
 

Republican Party members of the Indiana House of Representatives
1966 births
Living people
People from Shelbyville, Indiana
21st-century American politicians
Purdue University alumni
Indiana University alumni